Lamine Ndiaye (born 19 June 1995) is a French footballer who currently plays for CFA club GSI Pontivy as a defender.

Club career

MFK Košice
Ndiaye started his career at Lorient but fail to make through first team and was released in June 2014.
He made his professional Fortuna Liga debut for Košice on 19 May 2015 against ŽP Šport Podbrezová.
He came back to France during 2016 summer mercato and sign with GSI Pontivy.

References

External links
 MFK Košice profile
 
 Futbalnet profile
 Eurofotbal profile

1995 births
Living people
French footballers
French expatriate footballers
Association football defenders
FC Lorient players
FC VSS Košice players
GSI Pontivy players
Slovak Super Liga players
2. Liga (Slovakia) players
Expatriate footballers in Slovakia
French expatriate sportspeople in Slovakia